Eden Gardens is a railway station in Kolkata under the Kolkata Circular Railway (Chakra Rail) system. It belongs to the Eastern Railway. The station code is EDG. The station gets its name due to its proximity to the famous cricket stadium Eden Gardens of the same name. The station is located on the banks of Hooghly River at Babughat, near busy business area BBD Bagh in Kolkata. After the electrification of circular railway few EMU local trains pass through the station. This is a very important station and is mostly used by office goers. The station has only one platform.

Station complex
The platform is very much well sheltered. The station has many facilities including water and sanitation. It is well connected to the Strand Road.

Station layout

Track Layout

See also

References

External links
 
 
 

Railway stations in Kolkata
Kolkata Circular Railway
Sealdah railway division
Transport in Kolkata
Kolkata Suburban Railway stations